George Mallon may refer to: 

George B. Mallon (1865–1928), American journalist
George H. Mallon (1877–1934), U.S. Army officer and Medal of Honor recipient